This is a list of architects who have designed, completed, or topped-out skyscrapers over  tall (supertall).

References

Architects of supertall buildings
Supertall buildings